Melrose/Cedar Park is an MBTA Commuter Rail station located in downtown Melrose, Massachusetts. The station has two low-level platforms serving the two tracks of the Haverhill Line; it is not accessible.

History

The Boston and Maine Railroad (B&M) opened its line from Wilmington Junction to Boston on July 1, 1845. A station opened at Emerson Street in North Malden then or soon thereafter. The village was then sparsely populated; the station building also served as the post office and sometimes a churchroom. In 1850, the new development around the railroad prompted North Malden to split from Malden to form the town of Melrose. The station was quickly renamed Melrose as well.

Historically the primary station in Melrose, it has always been supplemented by nearby Wyoming Hill station and Melrose Highlands station. The original station was on the east side of the tracks; it was replaced by a newer station on the west side and converted for use as a freight house. Neither station building is extant, though sections of the platform roofs remain as shelters. 

The MBTA, formed in 1964 to subsidize suburban commuter rail service, began funding Reading Line service on January 18, 1965. As with the other two MBTA rail stations in Melrose, it would have become a station on the Orange Line extension north to Reading, had that project not been cancelled due to lack of funding. Around 1978, the MBTA modified the names of several stations for clarity, with Melrose station becoming Melrose–Cedar Park. The station building was demolished by that time.

By a 2018 count, Melrose/Cedar Park ranked 128 of 139 stations in ridership, averaging 99 daily boardings. In November 2020, as part of service cuts during the pandemic, the MBTA proposed to close Melrose/Cedar Park plus five other low-ridership stations on other line. The station was nominated for closure because of its low ridership and lack of accessibility. On December 14, 2020, the MBTA Board voted to enact a more limited set of cuts, including indefinitely closing the other five stations. Melrose/Cedar Park was kept open because of its location in a dense, walkable area where many residents do not own cars.

References

External links

MBTA - Melrose Cedar Park
Station from Emerson Street from Google Maps Street View

Buildings and structures in Melrose, Massachusetts
MBTA Commuter Rail stations in Middlesex County, Massachusetts
Railway stations in the United States opened in 1845